A super culture is a collection of cultures and/or subcultures, that interact with one another, share similar characteristics and collectively have a degree of sense of unity. In other words, Super-culture is a culture encompassing several subcultures with common elements.  This is distinct from the concept of Multiculture.

List of super cultures 

List of Super-cultures:
Rave - In modern society, rave is described as a culture closely defined as a super culture.
Steampunk - it is fast becoming a super-culture rather than a mere subculture.
Foodtruck collectives & Pop-up Restaurants + Shops.

Some ancient cultures that are also considered (termed) "Super-culture":
Megalithic Super-culture in Prehistoric Europe
Asian Super-culture (See Korean nationalist historiography)

See also

References

Subcultures